Kowloon Central was a geographical constituencies in the election for the Legislative Council of Hong Kong in 1991, which elects two members of the Legislative Council using the dual-seat constituency dual vote system. The constituency covers Kowloon City District and Wong Tai Sin District in Kowloon.

A by-election was held on 5 March 1995 after Lau Chin-shek resigned from his office to protest against government's withdrawal of Employment Bill.

The constituency was divided and replaced by the Kowloon Central, Kowloon North-east, and Kowloon South constituencies in 1995.

Returned members
Elected members are as follows:

Election results

References 

Constituencies of Hong Kong
Kowloon
Constituencies of Hong Kong Legislative Council
1991 establishments in Hong Kong
Constituencies established in 1991